Jörg Schmidt (born 20 December 1970) is a German former former professional footballer who played as a right midfielder.

External links
 

1970 births
Living people
German footballers
East German footballers
Association football midfielders
2. Bundesliga players
DDR-Oberliga players
FC Rot-Weiß Erfurt players
FC Hansa Rostock players
FC 08 Homburg players
Dynamo Dresden players
Chemnitzer FC players
Debreceni VSC players
FSV Zwickau players
VfB Fortuna Chemnitz players
German expatriate footballers
German expatriate sportspeople in Hungary
Expatriate footballers in Hungary